The Centre for Eastern Studies (OSW) is a Warsaw-based think tank that undertakes independent research on the political, economic and social situation in Central and Eastern Europe, Balkans, Caucasus and Central Asia.

The centre was founded in 1990 and is fully financed from the Polish state budget. In 2006 the centre was named in honour of its founder .

The OSW is the largest of the European Union’s think tanks to focus its research on the part of Europe which until 1989 had been separated from the West by the Iron Curtain.

The centre is particularly active in debates concerning the European Union's policy towards its Eastern neighbours (European Neighbourhood Policy, Eastern Partnership), challenges to energy security in Europe, as well as the political, social and economic transformation of countries neighbouring Poland.

Staff and work groups 
The OSW employs over 50 research fellows.

The centre's director is Adam Eberhardt.

There are five research units and a few single specialists (in energy policy and military aspects of international security):
 Russian Department
 Department of Ukraine, Belarus and Moldova
 Department of Turkey, the Caucasus and Central Asia
 Central Europe Department
 Department for Germany and Northern Europe

Publications 

Most of the OSW publications are available free of charge at the centre's web site, both in Polish and English (including "Policy Briefs", "OSW Studies" and "OSW Report").

External links 
 Centre for Eastern Studies official web site

1990 establishments in Poland
Think tanks established in 1990
Think tanks based in Poland
Foreign policy and strategy think tanks
Political and economic think tanks based in the European Union